Hertfordshire County Council elections were held on 7 June 2001, with all 77 seats contested. The Conservative Party took control of the council, winning 40 of the 77 seats.

Results

By ward

Division results

Broxbourne (6 seats)

Dacorum (10 seats)

East Herts (10 seats)

Hertsmere (7 seats)

North Herts (9 seats)

St Albans (10 seats)

Stevenage (6 seats)

Three Rivers (6 seats)

Watford (6 seats)

Welwyn Hatfield (7 seats)

References

2001 English local elections
2001
2000s in Hertfordshire
June 2001 events in the United Kingdom